Bongo Bongo or Bongo-Bongo may refer to:
 Bongo-Bongo (linguistics), an imaginary placeholder language
 Bongo Bongo Land, a British English pejorative term
 "Bongo Bongo Bongo I Don't Want to Leave the Congo", an alternative name for the 1947 song "Civilization"
 "Bongo Bong", a single by Manu Chao from the 2000 album Clandestino
 In The Legend of Zelda: Ocarina of Time, Bongo Bongo is the boss Link must fight at the end of the Shadow Temple.